A Rainy Day is an Indian Marathi language film directed by Rajendra Talak and produced by Priyanka Bidaye Talak. The film stars Mrinal Kulkarni, Subodh Bhave and Ajinkya Deo. Music by Ashok Patki. The film was released on 31 January 2014.

Synopsis 
Successful professional Aniket is willing to go to any length to achieve his dreams. However, things take a turn when his pregnant wife, Mugdha, learns about the ill deeds that he committed in childhood and he is clueless about her source.

Cast 
 Mrinal Kulkarni as Mugdha
 Subodh Bhave as Aniket 
 Ajinkya Deo
 Kiran Karmakar
 Harsh Chhaya
 Manoj Joshi
 Meenacshi Martins
 Neha Pendse
 Prince Jacob
 Sanjay Mone
 Shaila Kamat
 Sulabha Arya

Soundtrack

Critical response 
A Rainy Day film received positive reviews from critics. A Reviewer of The Times of India gave the film 3.5 stars out of 5 and wrote "Although the build up to the climax is well developed, the pace gets affected at a few places. But a gripping story combined with all other well-executed elements of cinema makes the film a worth watch". Swapnil Ghangale of Maharashtra Times wrote "It would have been more fun if things had been resolved logically". A Reviewer of Loksatta wrote "The director has used the rain which is sometimes shimmering and sometimes misty in a very appropriate way". Shubhangi Palve of Zee News wrote "By restraining the unnecessary things in the film, the film leaves an impression on the audience in a mysterious way".

References

External links
 
 

2014 films
2010s Marathi-language films
Indian drama films